Károly Némedi (born 16 January 1960) is a Hungarian diver. He competed in two events at the 1980 Summer Olympics.

References

External links
 

1960 births
Living people
Hungarian male divers
Olympic divers of Hungary
Divers at the 1980 Summer Olympics
Divers from Budapest
Sportspeople from Budapest